Sheikh Zaynolabideen Ghorbani , (born 1933) is an Iranian Ayatollah. He represented the Supreme Leader of Iran for Gilan Province, as well as leading prayers in Lahijan and Rasht. He represented the people in Gilan for both the Assembly of Experts (since 1990), and Islamic Consultative Assembly (from 1984 to 1988).

Personal life and education 

Ghorbani was born in a village called Panchah, Gilan province in 1933. He lost his father, Gholam Hassan, at the age of 5. They were a family involved in agriculture, and Ghorbani would help his family with farm work as well as attending school. He has 10 children, 7 sons and 3 daughters. Mohammad Hossein Ghorbani is also his nephew, who is a representative of Astaneh-ye Ashrafiyeh in the Islamic Consultative Assembly.

He attended his primary school in his hometown, where he learnt the basics of the Quran, as well as learning Persian. He then travelled to Lahijan to attend Islamic lessons there as well as learning Arabic. In 1950, he went to Qom to attend the Qom Seminary. While in Qom, he took classes taught by many esteemed Shia scholars. He took classes in Islamic jurisprudence and Principles of Islamic jurisprudence with Hossein Borujerdi and Ruhollah Khomeini, as well as Islamic philosophy with Muhammad Husayn Tabatabai. He reached Ijtihad after finishing his advanced Islamic lessons (Darse Kharej).

Teachers 
Here are some of the teachers Zaynolabideen Ghorbani had during his lifetime.

 Hossein Borujerdi
 Ruhollah Khomeini
 Muhammad Husayn Tabatabai
 Mohsen Jahangiri (Philosopher)
 Shikeh Mohammad Taghi Sotoudeh
 Musa al-Sadr
 Hossein Noori Hamedani
 Seyed Reza Sadr
 Hussein-Ali Montazeri
 Ali Meshkini
 Mohammad-Taqi Bahjat Foumani
 Mirza Mohammad Mojahedi Tabrizi
 Seyed Mohammad Baqer Soltani
 Mohammad-Reza Golpaygani
 Mirza Hashem Amoli
 Sheikh Abbas Ali Shahroudi

Political activity

Before the revolution 
Before the 1979 Iranian revolution, Ghorbani became acquainted with Navvab Safavi and joined the Fada'iyan-e Islam in  1952 while in Qom. After the execution of Safavi, Ghorbani went into hiding for some time. While in hiding, he also became acquainted with Ali Khamenei. As time went by, he became more vocal against the Shah, and was arrested by SAVAK in 1963. After the departure of Mohammad Beheshti to Germany in 1965, Ghorbani was re-arrested after engaging in activities related to Behehsti. He was arrested again in 1971 for 6 months for continuously making anti-Shah speeches, he was banned from leaving the country or engaging in Islamic affairs.

After the revolution 
After the removal of Mohammad Reza Pahlavi, Ghorbani was appointed by Ruhollah Khomeini to represent the Supreme Leader of Iran in Gilan Province, as well as being the Imam of Friday Prayer in Lahijan. He also represented the people in Gilan for the Iranian Parliament from 1984 to 1988, as well as representing them in the Assembly of Experts since 1990. After the death of Sadeq Ehsanbakhsh, Ghorbani was appointed by Ali Khamenei to br the Imam of Friday Prayer in Rasht. In 2018, Ghorbani resigned as representative of the Supreme Leader, as well the Friday Prayer leader in Rasht, after the controversy surrounding the Adineh Rasht Complex. After his resignation, Rasool Falahati was chosen to take over his positions. He also founded the Islamic Azad University, Lahijan Branch.

Works 

Zaynolabideen Ghorbani has published many works throughout his life, here are some of them.

 Towards the Eternal World
 History of Islamic Culture and Civilisation
 Islam and Human Rights
 The Cause of Progress in Islam and Decline of Muslims
 The Foundation of World Peace
 A Translation of Mulla Sadr's Treatise on the Creation of Deeds
 Philosophy of Human Creation
 The Biggest Disease of the 20th Century
 Islamic Ethics, Education and Training
 Translation of Volume 9 and 10 of al-Ghadir (complied while in prison)
 The Principles of Religion in the Light of the Infallibles (The Fourteen Infallibles)
 Islamic Government and Velayat Faqih
 The Worldview of Imam Ali (as) in the First Sermon of Nahj al-Balaghah
 Supplications of Shaaban
 Forty Hadith
 The Quran and the Divine Tradition

See also 

 List of Ayatollahs
 List of members in the Second Term of the Council of Experts
 List of members in the Third Term of the Council of Experts
 List of members in the Fourth Term of the Council of Experts
 List of members in the Fifth Term of the Council of Experts

References 

1933 births
Members of the Assembly of Experts
People from Gilan Province
Islamic Consultative Assembly
Living people
Iranian ayatollahs